"If You Say So" is a 2014 song by Lea Michele.

“If You Say So” may also refer to:

Music

Albums
If You Say So, album by Elsten Torres Uno Entertainment, 2008
If You Say So, EP by Paige (band)

Songs
"If You Say So", song by Mike Stern from Odds or Evens, 1991
"If You Say So", song by American band Samiam from You Are Freaking Me Out,  1997 
"If You Say So", song by Fulano de Tal from Etc. (Fulano de Tal album), 2000
"If You Say So", song by The Dear & Departed from Something Quite Peculiar, 2007
"If You Say So", song by Errol Dunkley, 1974